Hans Eisele may refer to:
 Hans Eisele (physician), Nazi doctor and convicted war criminal
 Hans Eisele (footballer), German football (soccer) player